The 57th Street station was an express station on the demolished IRT Second Avenue Line in Manhattan, New York City. It had two levels. The lower level had three tracks and two island platforms and served trains coming from the Bronx. The upper level had two tracks and one island platform and served trains coming from Queens, from the IRT Flushing Line, and IRT Astoria Line. The next stop to the north was 65th Street for local trains going to the Bronx, and Queensboro Plaza for trains going to Queens. The next express stop was 86th Street on Bronx-bound trains. The next stop to the south was 50th Street for all local trains and 42nd Street for express trains. The station closed on June 13, 1942, although trains to the Bronx stopped serving it on June 11, 1940.

References

External links
 

IRT Second Avenue Line stations
Railway stations closed in 1942
Former elevated and subway stations in Manhattan
57th Street (Manhattan)